Windsor Police Station Stables is a heritage-listed former military barracks and now police building at 32-34 Bridge Street, Windsor, City of Hawkesbury, New South Wales, Australia. It was built in 1836 by Major Barney. The property is owned by the New South Wales Police. It was added to the New South Wales State Heritage Register on 2 April 1999.

History 

This building was constructed in 1836 by Major Barney and used as the Mounted Police Barracks.

Description 
It is a two-storey building designed in the colonial Georgian style, with a sandstock brick exterior.

Modifications and dates 
 1818 - 1820: Windsor Military Barracks established
 1830 - 1840: Additions
 1836: Present building constructed.

Heritage listing 
The Windsor Police Station Stables, originally a military barracks building, remains as a part of an important outpost of the earliest colonial government provision of law and order.

Windsor Police Station Stables was listed on the New South Wales State Heritage Register on 2 April 1999.

References

Bibliography

Attribution 

New South Wales State Heritage Register
Windsor, New South Wales
Military installations in New South Wales
Articles incorporating text from the New South Wales State Heritage Register
Former Barracks in Australia